Pargas is a former town and municipality in south-western Finland. On 1 January 2009, it was consolidated with Houtskär, Iniö, Korpo and Nagu to form the new municipality of Väståboland (since renamed to Pargas).

It is known as the "capital" of the archipelago of Turku and had been called a town since 1977. It is located in the province of Western Finland and is part of the Southwest Finland region.

The municipality was bilingual, with the majority (54%) being Swedish and the minority (45%) Finnish speakers.

The city has many little suburbs around it, including Kirjala and Lielax.

International relations

Twin towns — Sister cities
The sister cities of Pargas are

  Haninge, Sweden
  Ulstein, Norway
  Chudovo, Russia
  Kärdla, Estonia

References

External links 
 
 
 Official website – in Swedish and Finnish

Populated places disestablished in 2009
2009 disestablishments in Finland
Populated coastal places in Finland
Former municipalities of Finland
Pargas